(1962 – April 14, 2005), better known by his stage name , was a Japanese noise musician. He was one of the earliest in Japan's noise scene, and it was Iwasaki who organized Masami Akita's first Merzbow show in Osaka, Japan. He was also involved in ABM (with Fusao Toda and Naoto Hayashi), MXM (with Macronympha), and Sian (with Aube).

Iwasaki died in a motorcycle accident in 2005.

Discography
 Portuguese Man-of-War (1991)
 Irresponsibility (1991)
 Purgatory (1992)
 Psychosomatic Performance (1993)
 Selected Noise Works 93-94 (1994)
 Fragmentagraph (1996) (split with Pain Jerk)
 Monde Bruits (1999)

References

External links

1962 births
2005 deaths
Japanese experimental musicians
Noise musicians
20th-century Japanese musicians